Frederick Ward may refer to:

Frederick Townsend Ward (1831–1862), American sailor and mercenary 
Frederick Wordsworth Ward aka, Captain Thunderbolt (1833–1870), Australian bushranger
Frederick William Ward (1874–1934), Australian newspaper editor
Frederick Ward (Australian politician) (1873–1954), Australian senator
Frederick Ward (cricketer) (1881–1948), English cricketer, played one first class game for Yorkshire
Frederick Ward (theatre) (born 1887), Australian actor and theatre businessman
Fred Ward (rugby league) (1932–2012), English footballer and coach
Frederick N. Ward (1935–2016), photojournalist
Fred Ward (1942-2022), American actor
Yaffer Ward (Frederick Ward, 1895–1953), English footballer
Frederick Charles Ward (1900–1990), furniture and interior designer in Australia

See also
Frederic Ward Putnam (1839–1915), American naturalist and anthropologist
Frederic Warde (1894–1939), typographic designer
Frederick Warde (1851–1935), Shakespearean actor
Frederick Warde (cricketer), English cricketer
Frederick Ward Merriman, New Zealand politician